Jeremiah Joseph d'Arcy (December 4, 1885 – July 1, 1924), also known as Jerry Dorsey, was a professional baseball outfielder. He played in two games for the 1911 Pittsburgh Pirates, without recording a hit in six at-bats.

References

External links

1885 births
1924 deaths
Major League Baseball outfielders
Pittsburgh Pirates players
Denison Railroaders players
Baseball players from Oakland, California
Henderson Hens players
Bonham Blues players
Denison Champions players
Gadsden Steel Makers players
McAlester Miners players
Memphis Turtles players
Sherman Browns players
Tulsa Producers players